The 1980 European Tour was the ninth official season of golf tournaments known as the PGA European Tour and organised by the Professional Golfers' Association.

The season was made up of 23 tournaments counting for the Official Money List, and some non-counting tournaments later known as "Approved Special Events".

The Official Money List was won by Scotland's Sandy Lyle.

Changes for 1980
There were several changes from the previous season, with the addition of the Newcastle Brown "900" Open, the Merseyside International Open and the Bob Hope British Classic; and the loss of the British PGA Matchplay Championship, the Portuguese Open and the Belgian Open.

Schedule
The following table lists official events during the 1980 season.

Unofficial events
The following events were sanctioned by the European Tour, but did not carry official money, nor were wins official.

Official money list
The official money list was based on prize money won during the season, calculated in Pound sterling.

Awards

See also
List of golfers with most European Tour wins

Notes

References

External links
1980 season results on the PGA European Tour website
1980 Order of Merit on the PGA European Tour website

European Tour seasons
European Tour